Poecilochroa is a genus of ground spiders that was first described by Niklas Westring in 1874.

Description 
As Gnaphosidae, Poecilochroa have large cylindrical spinnerets. They are nocturnal, spending the day in silken retreats and going out at night to hunt.

Poecilochroa are divided into two gnaphosid groups based on their abdomen colouration: those with plain abdomens are in the Echemus group, while those with black and white abdomen are in the Herpyllus group. Males of both groups have well-developed dorsal scuta.

Habitat 
Poecilochroa occur in various habitats including on and under stones and dead leaves, on vegetation, in steppes, grasslands, dry fields, stream beds and forest floors.

Species
 it contains thirty-nine species and one subspecies:
Poecilochroa albomaculata (Lucas, 1846) – Western Mediterranean
Poecilochroa alcala Barrion & Litsinger, 1995 – Philippines
Poecilochroa anomala (Hewitt, 1915) – South Africa
Poecilochroa antineae Fage, 1929 – Mali
Poecilochroa barmani Tikader, 1982 – India
Poecilochroa behni Thorell, 1891 – India (Nicobar Is.)
Poecilochroa bifasciata Banks, 1902 – Ecuador (Galapagos Is.)
Poecilochroa capensis Strand, 1909 – South Africa
Poecilochroa carinata Caporiacco, 1947 – Uganda
Poecilochroa dayamibrookiana Barrion & Litsinger, 1995 – Philippines
Poecilochroa devendrai Gajbe & Rane, 1985 – India
Poecilochroa faradjensis Lessert, 1929 – Congo
Poecilochroa furcata Simon, 1914 – France, Italy, Greece
Poecilochroa golan Levy, 1999 – Israel
Poecilochroa haplostyla Simon, 1907 – São Tomé and Príncipe
Poecilochroa incompta (Pavesi, 1880) – Tunisia
Poecilochroa insularis Kulczyński, 1911 – Indonesia (Java)
Poecilochroa involuta Tucker, 1923 – South Africa
Poecilochroa joreungensis Paik, 1992 – Korea
Poecilochroa latefasciata Simon, 1893 – Peru
Poecilochroa loricata Kritscher, 1996 – Malta
Poecilochroa malagassa Strand, 1907 – Madagascar
Poecilochroa parangunifasciata Barrion & Litsinger, 1995 – Philippines
Poecilochroa patricia (Simon, 1878) – France (Corsica)
Poecilochroa pauciaculeis Caporiacco, 1947 – East Africa
Poecilochroa perversa Simon, 1914 – France
Poecilochroa phyllobia (Thorell, 1871) – Italy
Poecilochroa pugnax (O. Pickard-Cambridge, 1874) – Libya, Egypt, Ethiopia, Israel
Poecilochroa rollini Berland, 1933 – French Polynesia (Marquesas Is., Tuamotu)
Poecilochroa sedula (Simon, 1897) – India
Poecilochroa senilis (O. Pickard-Cambridge, 1872) – France (Corsica) to Turkmenistan
Poecilochroa s. auspex (Simon, 1878) – Spain, France
Poecilochroa taborensis Levy, 1999 – Israel, Cyprus, Greece, Portugal
Poecilochroa taeguensis Paik, 1992 – Korea
Poecilochroa tikaderi Patel, 1989 – India
Poecilochroa tridotus Caleb & Mathai, 2013 – India
Poecilochroa trifasciata Mello-Leitão, 1918 – Brazil
Poecilochroa variana (C. L. Koch, 1839) (type) – Europe to Central Asia
Poecilochroa viduata (Pavesi, 1883) – Ethiopia
Poecilochroa vittata Kulczyński, 1911 – Indonesia (Java)

References

Araneomorphae genera
Gnaphosidae
Spiders of Africa
Spiders of Asia
Spiders of South America